The Jeux de la Francophonie (Canadian English: Francophonie Games; British English: Francophone Games) are a combination of artistic and sporting events for the Francophonie, mostly French-speaking nations and former colonies of France, held every four years since 1989.

Editions

Events

Sports
There were four sports at the inaugural event in 1989: athletics, basketball, association football and judo. Handisport, handball, table tennis and wrestling were added to the competition programme in 1994. None of these four sports featured at the 1997 Jeux de la Francophonie, and boxing and tennis were introduced to the programme instead. Eight sports featured in 2001: the four inaugural sports, boxing and table tennis were included. Furthermore, handisport and beach volleyball competitions were held as demonstration events. Neither of these demonstration sports were included in 2005, with traditional style wrestling being demonstrated in addition to the six more established sports. The 2009 programme re-introduced beach volleyball.

  Athletics : 1989, 1994, 1997, 2001, 2005, 2009, 2013, 2017
  Basketball : 1989, 1994, 1997, 2001, 2005, 2009, 2013, 2017
  Beach volleyball : 2001, 2009
  Boxing : 1997, 2001, 2005, 2009, 2013
  Cycling : 2013
  Road cycling (demonstration) : 2017
  Disabled sports : 2001, 2009, 2017
  Football : 1989, 1994, 1997, 2001, 2005, 2009, 2013, 2017
  Handball : 1994
  Judo : 1989, 1994, 1997, 2001, 2005, 2009, 2013, 2017
  Table tennis : 1994, 2001, 2005, 2009, 2013, 2017
  Tennis : 1997
  Wrestling : 1994, 2013, 2017
  Traditional African wrestling : 2005 (demonstration), 2013, 2017

Cultural
The Jeux de la Francophonie are distinctive, if not unique, among international multi-sport competitions for including competitive cultural performances and exhibitions, complete with gold, silver, and bronze medals for winning participants.
Song
Storytelling
Traditional inspiration dance
Poetry
Painting
Photography
Sculpture

In 2001, street art was featured as a demonstration event.

Medal table
An all-time Jeux de la Francophonie Medal Table from 1989 Jeux de la Francophonie to 2017 Jeux de la Francophonie, is tabulated below. The table is simply the consequence of the sum of the medal tables of the various editions of the Jeux de la Francophonie.

Participation

Jeux de la Francophonie are open to athletes and artists of the 55 member nations, 3 associate member nations and 12 observer nations of the Francophonie. Canada is represented by three teams: Quebec, New Brunswick (the only officially bilingual Canadian province), and a team representing the remainder of Canada. The Belgian team is restricted to athletes from the French-speaking areas of the country.

Participation has so far varied between 1,700 and 4,000 athletes and artists in the past 20 years.

55 member nations or governments

Three associate member nations

Observer territories, nations, and provinces

See also
 Commonwealth Games
 Lusophony Games
 Mediterranean Games

References

External links
Official site of the Comité international des jeux de la Francophonie 

 
Francophonie
Organisation internationale de la Francophonie
Recurring sporting events established in 1989
Quadrennial sporting events